Kuzman (Bulgarian, Macedonian and ) is a male given name, the South Slavic variant of the Greek Cosmas. It may refer to:

Kuzman Shapkarev (1834-1909), Bulgarian folklorist
Kuzman Sotirović (1908-1990), Serbian and Yugoslav footballer
Pasko Kuzman, Macedonian archaeologist
Kuzman Babeu (b. 1971), retired Serbian footballer
Kuzman Josifovski Pitu, partisan
Kuzman Kapidan, popular hero of Bulgarian and Macedonian epic poetry

See also
Jerry Koosman (born 1942), American baseball player
Kuzmanović
Kuzmanovski

Serbian masculine given names
Macedonian masculine given names
Bulgarian masculine given names